The 1915 Stanley Cup Finals was played from March 22–26, 1915. The Pacific Coast Hockey Association (PCHA) champion Vancouver Millionaires swept the National Hockey Association (NHA) champion Ottawa Senators three games to none in a best-of-five game series. The finals were played in Vancouver, with games one, three and five played under PCHA rules. The Millionaires became the first team from the PCHA to win the Cup. This was the second Stanley Cup championship series between the champions of the NHA and the PCHA and the first held in a PCHA rink.

Paths to the Finals

In 1914 the PCHA and NHA agreed to a yearly challenge series between the two teams that won each league for the right to hold the Stanley Cup, effectively ending the challenge era for the Cup.

Vancouver finished the 1914–15 PCHA regular season in first place, and thus winning that league's title, with a record of 13–4. Meanwhile, Ottawa and the Montreal Wanderers both finished the 1914–15 NHA regular season tied for first place with identical 14–6 records, and thus had to play a two-game total goals series to determine the NHA champion. Ottawa won this series 4–1 to advance to the Stanley Cup final. Ottawa left for Vancouver, which hosted the series that year, on March 15.

Game summaries

All games of the championship finals were played at Vancouver's Denman Arena, the home of the PCHA champion Millionaires. Vancouver ended up sweeping the series with victories of 6–2, 8–3, and 12–3, scoring 26 total goals while limiting the Senators to just eight overall. Former Senator Cyclone Taylor led the Millionaires with six goals. Future Hockey Hall of Famer Barney Stanley scored five goals, including three in the second period of game three. The Cup was not brought west to Vancouver by the Senators, so was not immediately presented to the winners.

 Vancouver Millionaires PCHA champions - Starting Lineup - Hugh Leahman goalie, Lloydy Cook point, Frank Patrick (manager-coach/owner) cover point, Fred "Cyclone" Taylor rover-center, Duncan "Mickey" MacKay center-left wing, Frank Nighbor right wing, Russell "Barney" Stanley left wing - subs Kenny Mallen defence, Jim Seanboar defence, Silas "Si" Griffis (captain) defence - Spare - Jean "Johnny" Matz - Center
 Ottawa Senators NHA champions - Starting Lineup - Clint Benedict goalie, Horace Merrill point, Art Ross cover point, Eddie Gerard (Captain) - left wing-rover, Angus Duford center, Harry "Punch" Broadbent right wing, Leth Graham left wing - subs Jack Darragh right wing-center, Hamilton "Hamby" Shore left wing - Spares - Bill Bell center, Fred Lake defence, Ed Lowrey center, Art Sullivan center, Sammy Herbert - goalie, Frank Saughneesy (Manager), Alf Smith (Coach).

Stanley Cup engraving
The 1915 Stanley Cup was presented by the trophy's trustee William Foran.

The following Millionaires players and staff were eligible to have their names engraved on the Stanley Cup

1914–15 Vancouver Millionaires

See also
1914–15 NHA season
1914–15 PCHA season

References

Bibliography

 
 

 
 

 

1910s in Vancouver
1915 in British Columbia
Stanley Cup
1914–15 PCHA season
March 1915 sports events
Ice hockey competitions in Vancouver
Ottawa Senators (original) games
Stanley Cup Finals
1915